Asterella bolanderi is a liverwort in the family Aytoniaceae. It is found in the undergrowth of chaparral habitat and on shady banks. Commonly found within Northern California at elevations lower than 3000 feet, its distribution also ranges along the coast into Southern California. Other members of the Asterella genus include A. californica and A. palmeri.

References

Aytoniaceae
Flora of California
Bryophyta of North America
Flora without expected TNC conservation status